Georges Creek may refer to:

Places

Australia
Georges Creek (Armidale Dumaresq), a tributary of the Macleay River in New South Wales

In the United States
 Maryland:
George's Creek, Maryland, unincorporated community in Allegany County
Georges Creek (Potomac River), a tributary of the Potomac River in western Maryland
Georges Creek Valley is located in Allegany County, Maryland along the Georges Creek (Potomac River)
 North Carolina:
 Georges Creek (Deep River tributary), a stream in Chatham County, North Carolina
 Ohio:
Georges Creek (Ohio Brush Creek), a stream in Ohio
 Pennsylvania:
Georges Creek (Monongahela River tributary), a stream in Fayette County, Pennsylvania
Texas:
George's Creek, Texas, an unincorporated community in Texas
Virginia:
Georges Creek (Whitethorn Creek tributary), a stream in Pittsylvania County, Virginia
 West Virginia:
Georges Creek (Kanawha River), a stream in West Virginia

Other uses

In the United States
Georges Creek Coal and Iron Company (1835-1863), a defunct coal mining, iron producer and railroad company that operated in Maryland
Georges Creek Railroad (1853-1863), a railroad operated by the Georges Creek Coal and Iron Company in Western Maryland between Westernport, Maryland, and Frostburg, Maryland 
Georges Creek and Cumberland Railroad (1876-1917), a railroad that operated in Maryland between Cumberland, Maryland Lonaconing, Maryland
Georges Creek Subdivision (1987-2015), a railroad line owned by CSX Transportation along the former Thomas Subdivision of the Western Maryland Railway (WM)
Georges Creek Railway (2006), a 14-mile line shortline railroad between Westernport, Maryland and Carlos, Maryland

See also
 George River
 George Creek